Benjamin Moukandjo Bilé (born 12 November 1988) is a Cameroonian professional footballer who last played as a forward for Greek club AEL.

Club career
Moukandjo began his career in hometown's Kadji Sports Academy, joining the club's youth setup in 1998, aged 10. Nine years later he moved to France, joining Stade Rennais. In September 2008, after making appearances only for the reserve team of Stade Rennais, he was loaned out to L'Entente SSG.

Moukandjo returned to Rennes in June 2009, but rescinded his link and joined Nîmes Olympique on 31 August 2009. He appeared regularly for the side in Ligue 2, and later moved to AS Monaco FC on 31 January 2011.

In May 2011, after Monaco's relegation to Ligue 2, Moukandjo was linked with Liverpool. He joined AS Nancy Lorraine on 12 August 2011 by signing a three-season contract.

On 18 July 2014, Moukandjo moved to Ligue 1 side Stade de Reims on a two-year deal.

On 5 August 2015, Moukandjo joined FC Lorient, also of Ligue 1. On 8 April 2017, he scored two of Lorient's goals and provided an assist for Sylvain Marveaux in their 4–1 league away win over Olympique Lyonnais.

On 13 July 2017, Moukandjo moved to the Chinese Super League side Jiangsu Suning on a two-year deal. On 28 February 2018, Moukandjo was loaned to Beijing Renhe until 31 December 2018.

In March 2019 he left Jiangsu Suning by mutual consent.

On 11 September 2019, Moukandjo joined Ligue 2 side Lens.

On 23 January 2020, after his release with RC Lens, Moukandjo joined Ligue 2 rivals Valenciennes FC.

On 28 January 2021, Moukandjo signed with Greek club AEL.

International career
On 4 June 2011, Moukandjo made his debut for the Cameroon national football team, starting in a 0–0 2012 Africa Cup of Nations qualification draw against Senegal. He netted his first international goal on 16 June of the following year, the winner against Guinea-Bissau.

Moukandjo was selected in Cameroon's squad for the 2014 FIFA World Cup and started in all three group matches, against Mexico, Croatia and Brazil respectively.

At the 2015 African Cup of Nations, he scored Cameroon's goal in a 1–1 draw with Guinea at the group stage.

Two years later, he was named Man of the Match in the final as Cameroon won the Africa Cup of Nations for the fifth time.

In September 2018 he retired from international duty, having scored eight goals in 57 appearances.

Career statistics

Club

International goals
Scores and results list Cameroon's goal tally first, score column indicates score after each Moukandjo goal.

Honours
Cameroon
Africa Cup of Nations: 2017

References

External links

Stade Rennais profile 

1988 births
Living people
Footballers from Douala
Cameroonian footballers
Association football forwards
Cameroon international footballers
Kadji Sports Academy players
Stade Rennais F.C. players
Nîmes Olympique players
Entente SSG players
AS Monaco FC players
AS Nancy Lorraine players
Stade de Reims players
FC Lorient players
Jiangsu F.C. players
Beijing Renhe F.C. players
RC Lens players
Valenciennes FC players
Athlitiki Enosi Larissa F.C. players
Ligue 1 players
Ligue 2 players
Championnat National players
Chinese Super League players
Super League Greece players
2014 FIFA World Cup players
2015 Africa Cup of Nations players
2017 Africa Cup of Nations players
2017 FIFA Confederations Cup players
Moukandjo
Cameroonian expatriate footballers
Cameroonian expatriate sportspeople in France
Expatriate footballers in France
Cameroonian expatriate sportspeople in China
Expatriate footballers in China
Cameroonian expatriate sportspeople in Greece
Expatriate footballers in Greece